Lei Fei (known professionally as Jewel Lee; born: March 3, 1975) is an actor, businesswoman, and a retired professional wushu taolu athlete from Macau.

Life

Wushu career 
Born in Guangxi, Lei was transferred to Macau to develop the country's status in the international competitive wushu circuit. Her first major international appearance was at the 1994 Asian Games in Hiroshima, Japan, where she won the silver medal in women's nanquan, the first silver medal for Macau at the Asian Games. A year later, she competed in the 1995 World Wushu Championships in Baltimore, United States, where she won a silver medal in qiangshu and was the world champion in nanquan. Three years later, she competed in the 1998 Asian Games in Bangkok, Thailand, and won another silver medal in women's changquan. Her last competition was at the 1999 World Wushu Championships where she was a triple medalist and a world champion in qiangshu.

Acting and entrepreneurial career 
In 1996, Lei was the runner-up Miss Macau. After retiring from competitive wushu, she started to develop her career as a film and television actor. She took on various small roles in films throughout Hong Kong and Macau, and was hailed as the successor to Michelle Yeoh. In 2001, she graduated from Australia's Macquarie University with degrees in international finance and corporate management. After graduating, she joined the Shenzhen Sannuo Group Company, becoming its vice-president in 2008.

See also 
 List of Asian Games medalists in wushu

References

External links 
 Li Fei on HKMDB

Living people
Wushu practitioners at the 1994 Asian Games
Wushu practitioners at the 1998 Asian Games
Asian Games silver medalists for Macau
Medalists at the 1994 Asian Games
Medalists at the 1998 Asian Games
Macau women in business
Macau female wushu practitioners
Asian Games medalists in wushu
Year of birth missing (living people)
Macanese film actresses